Mount Vernon is a hamlet in the town of Hamburg in Erie County, New York, United States. It is located within the Wanakah census-designated place and is part of the Frontier Central School District.  The Hamlet is separate from the city of Mount Vernon, a city in Westchester County.

References

Hamlets in New York (state)
Hamlets in Erie County, New York